186 (one hundred [and] eighty-six) is the natural number following 185 and preceding 187.

In mathematics
There is no integer with exactly 186 coprimes less than it, so 186 is a nontotient. It is also never the difference between an integer and the total of coprimes below it, so it is a noncototient.

There are 186 different pentahexes, shapes formed by gluing together five regular hexagons, when rotations of shapes are counted as distinct from each other.

186 is a Fine number.

See also
 The year AD 186 or 186 BC
 List of highways numbered 186

References

Integers